Natasha Donovan is a Métis Canadian illustrator who focuses on comics and children's illustration. She is a member of the Métis Nation of British Columbia.

Life and education 
Though Donovan's "Métis family are the Delarondes and the Morins from Meadow Lake, Saskatchewan," she spent the majority of her life in Vancouver, British Columbia. She is a member of the Métis Nation of British Columbia.

Donovan received a Bachelor of Arts in Anthropology from the University of British Columbia.

Donovan currently lives in Deming, Washington with her partner, Sky, and their dog, Luna.

Career 
Donovan taught herself how to draw, and before beginning her career in illustration, she worked in academia and magazine publishing at the University of Victoria.

Awards and honors

Publications 

 Surviving the City, written by Tasha Spillett (2019)
 Go Dance!, written by Cinnamon Spear (2020)
 Borders, written by Thomas King (2021)
 Classified: The Secret Career of Mary Golda Ross, Cherokee Aerospace Engineer, written by Traci Sorell (2021)
 The Global Ocean, written by Rochelle Strauss (2022)
 A River's Gifts: The Mighty Elwha River Reborn by Patricia Newman (2022)

Mothers of Xsan series 

 The Sockeye Mother, written by  Hetxw'ms Gyetxw (Brett D. Huson) (2018)
 The Grizzly Mother, written by  Hetxw'ms Gyetxw (Brett D. Huson) (2019)
 The Eagle Mother, written by  Hetxw'ms Gyetxw (Brett D. Huson) (2020)
 The Frog Mother, written by  Hetxw'ms Gyetxw (Brett D. Huson) (2021)
 The Raven Mother, written by  Hetxw'ms Gyetxw (Brett D. Huson) (2022)

Surviving the City series 

 Surviving the City, written by Tasha Spillett (2019)
 From the Roots Up, written by Tasha Spillett (2020)

Anthology contributions 

 The Other Side: An Anthology of Queer Paranormal Romance, edited by Melanie Gillman and Kori Michele Handwerker (2016)
 This Place: 150 Years Retold (2019)
 Marvel's Voices: Heritage (2022)

References

External links 

 Official website

Living people
Métis artists
21st-century Canadian artists
Canadian illustrators
Year of birth missing (living people)